Panchayati Raj (Council of five officials) is the system of local self-government of villages in rural India as opposed to urban and suburban municipalities.

It consists of the Panchayati Raj Institutions (PRIs) through which the self-government of villages is realized. They are tasked with "economic development, strengthening social justice and implementation of Central and State Government Schemes including those 29 subjects listed in the Eleventh Schedule."

Part IX of the Indian Constitution is the section of the Constitution relating to the Panchayats. It stipulates that in states or Union Territories with more than two million inhabitants there are three levels of PRIs:
the Gram Panchayats at village level
the Mandal Parishad or Block Samiti or Panchayat Samiti at block level and
the Zila Parishad at district level.
In states or Union Territories with less than two million inhabitants there are only two levels of PRIs. The Gram Sabha consists of all registered voters living in the area of a Gram Panchayat and is the organization through which village inhabitants participate directly in local government. Elections for the members of the Panchayats at all levels take place every five years. The Panchayats must include members of Scheduled Castes (SCs) and Scheduled Tribes (STs) in the same proportion as in the general population. One third of all seats and chairperson posts must be reserved for women, in some states half of all seats and chairperson posts.

The modern Panchayati Raj system was introduced in India by the 73rd constitutional amendment in 1992, although it is based upon the historical Panchayati raj system of the Indian subcontinent and is also present in Pakistan, Bangladesh and Nepal. Following a proposal submitted in 1986 by the LM Singhvi Committee to make certain changes to the Panchayati raj institutions, which had already existed in early Indian history and which had been reintroduced, not very successfully, in the 20th century, the modern Panchayati raj system was formalized and introduced in India in April 1999 as the 73rd Amendment to the Constitution, following a study conducted by a number of Indian committees on various ways of implementing a more decentralized administration. The modern Panchayati Raj and its Gram Panchayats are not to be confused with the extra-constitutional Khap Panchayats found in parts of western Uttar Pradesh and Haryana.

In India, the Panchayati Raj now functions as a system of governance in which gram panchayats are the basic units of local administration. Currently, the Panchayati Raj system exists in all states except Nagaland, Meghalaya, and Mizoram, and in all Union Territories except Delhi.

The Panchayats receive funds from three sources:
 Local body grants, as recommended by the Central Finance Commission
 Funds for implementation of centrally sponsored schemes
 Funds released by the state governments on the recommendations of the State Finance Commissions

History 
Panchayati raj originated in 2nd millennium BCE in India during Vedic times. Since Vedic times, the village (gram) in the country is considered as the basic unit for regional self-administration.

Mahatma Gandhi advocated Panchayati Raj as the foundation of India's political system, as a decentralized form of government in which each village would be responsible for its own affairs. The term for such a vision was Gram Swaraj  ("village self-governance"). Instead, India developed a highly centralized form of government. However, this has been moderated by the delegation of several administrative functions to the local level, empowering elected gram panchayats. There are significant differences between the traditional Panchayati Raj system, that was envisioned by Gandhi, and the system formalized in India in 1992.

The Panchayati Raj system was first adopted by the state of Bihar by the Bihar Panchayat Raj Act of 1947. It was a continued legacy of local self government started by Lord Ripon in the British era. Later it was implemented by the state of Rajasthan in Nagaur district on 2 October 1959. During the 1950s and 60s, other state governments adopted this system as laws were passed to establish panchayats in various states. 

The Balwant Rai Mehta Committee, headed by the Member of Parliament Balwantrai Mehta, was a committee appointed by the Government of India in January 1957 to examine the work of the Community Development Programme (1952) and the National Extension Service (1953), to suggest measures to improve their work. The committee's recommendation was implemented by NDC in January 1958, and this set the stage for the launching of Panchayati Raj Institutions throughout the country. The committee recommended the establishment of the scheme of ‘democratic decentralization’, which finally came to be known as Panchayati Raj. This led to the establishment of a three-tier Panchayati Raj system: Gram Panchayat at the village level, Panchayat Samiti at the block level, and Zila Parishad at the district level.

On 24 April 1993, the Constitutional (73rd amendment) Act of 1992 came into force in India to provide constitutional status to the Panchayati Raj institutions. This amendment was extended to Panchayats in the tribal areas of eight states, namely: Andhra Pradesh, Gujarat, Himachal Pradesh, Maharashtra, Madhya Pradesh, Odisha, and Rajasthan beginning on 24 December 1996. This amendment contains provisions for the devolution of powers and responsibilities to the panchayats, both for the preparation of economic development plans and social justice, as well as for implementation in relation to 29 subjects listed in the eleventh schedule of the constitution, and the ability to levy and collect appropriate taxes, duties, tolls and fees. The Act aims to provide a three-tier system of Panchayati Raj for all states having a population of over two million, to hold Panchayat elections regularly every five years, to provide seats reserved for scheduled castes, scheduled tribes and women, to appoint a State Finance Commission to make recommendations regarding the financial powers of the Panchayats, and to constitute a District Planning Committee.

Gram panchayat sabha 
The Sarpanch is its elected head. The members of the gram panchayat are elected directly by the voting-age village population for a period of five years.

Sources of income 
Taxes collected locally such as on water, place of pilgrimage, local Mandirs (temples,mosques, church), and markets
A fixed grant from the State Government in proportion to the land revenue and money for works and schemes assigned to the Parishads
Donations

Block level panchayat or Panchayat Samiti 

Just as the tehsil goes by other names in various parts of India, notably mandal and taluka, there are a number of variations in nomenclature for the block panchayat. For example, it is known as Mandal Praja Parishad in Andhra Pradesh, Taluka Panchayat in Gujarat and Karnataka, and Panchayat Samiti in Maharashtra. In general, the block panchayat has the same form as the gram panchayat but at a higher level.

Composition 
Membership in the block panchayat is mostly ex-official; it is composed of: all of the Sarpanchas (gram panchayat chairmen) in the Panchayat Samiti area, the MPs and MLAs of the area, the Sub-District Officer (SDO) of the sub-division, co-opt members (representatives of the SCs , STs and women), associate members (a farmer from the area, a representative of the cooperative societies and one from marketing services), and some elected members. However, in Kerala, block panchayat members are directly elected, just like gram panchayat and district panchayat members.

The Panchayat Samiti is elected for a term of five years and is headed by a chairman and a deputy chairman.

Departments 
The common departments in the Samiti are as follows:
 General Administration
 Finance
 Public Works
 Agriculture
 Health
 Education
 Social Welfare
 Information Technology
 Water Supply Department
 Animal Husbandry and others

There is an officer for every department. A government-appointed Block Development Officer (BDO) is the executive officer to the Samiti and the chief of its administration, and is responsible for his work to the CEO of ZP.

Functions 
 Implementation of schemes for the development of agriculture and infrastructure
 Establishment of Community Health Centres (CHCs) and primary schools
 Supply of clean drinking water, drainage and construction/repair of roads
 Development of a cottage and small-scale industries, and the opening of cooperative societies
 Establishment of youth organisations in India

Zilla parishad 

The governing of the advance system at the district level in Panchayat Raj is also popularly known as Zilla Parishad. The chief of administration is an officer of the IAS cadre and chief officer of the Panchayat raj for the district level.

Composition 
The membership varies from 40 to 60 and usually comprises:
 Deputy Commissioner of the District
 Presidents of all Panchayat Samitis in the district
 Heads of all Government Departments in the district
 members of Parliament and Members of Legislative Assemblies in the district
 a representative of each cooperative society
 some women and Scheduled Caste members, if not adequately represented
 co-opted members having extraordinary experience and achievements in public service.

Functions 
 Provide essential services and facilities to the rural population
 Supply improved seeds to farmers and inform them of new farming techniques
 Set up and run schools and libraries in rural areas
 Start primary health centers and hospitals in villages; start vaccination drives against epidemics
 Execute plans for the development of the scheduled castes and tribes; run ashram for Adivasi children; set up free hostels for them.
 Encourage entrepreneurs to start small-scale industries and implement rural employment schemes.
 Construct bridges, roads and other public facilities and their maintenance
 Provide employment.
Works on Sanitation related issues

System in Practice 
The Panchayats, throughout the years, have relied on federal and state grants to sustain themselves economically. The absence of mandatory elections for the Panchayat council and infrequent meetings of the Sarpanch have decreased the spread of information to villagers, leading to more state regulation. Many Panchayats have been successful in achieving their goals, through cooperation between different bodies and the political mobilization of previously underrepresented groups in India. There is an obstacle of literacy that many Panchayats face for engagement of villagers, with most development schemes being on paper. However, homes linked to the Panchayati Raj System have seen an increase in participation for local matters. The reservation policy for women on the Panchayat councils have also led to a substantial increase in female participation and have shaped the focus of development to include more domestic household issues.

In popular culture 
In 2020, the Indian series Panchayat premiered with a second season in 2022. While Panchayat is mainly based on village life of an underpaid panchayat secretary, it also loosely highlights the day to day working of a panchayat and daily life in an ordinary Indian village in a humorous way. It succeeds in showing how  women are sidelined in the panchayat politics even though government has mandated women representation and how elected Panchayat representatives often have to beg MP & MLAs for funds for their villages development.

See also 
National Panchayati Raj Day
Local self-government in India

Notes and references

Sources
  Nepal glossary, United States Library of Congress
  Article 333357, zeenews.com
  Article India994-07, hrw.org

Further reading 
 Mitra, Subrata K.; Singh, V.B. (1999).  Democracy and Social Change in India: A Cross-Sectional Analysis of the National Electorate.  New Delhi: Sage Publications.   (India HB)  (U.S. HB).
 Mitra, Subrata K.. (2001). "Making Local Government Work: Local elites, Panchayati raj and governance in India", in Kohli, Atul (ed.). The Success of India's Democracy. Cambridge: Cambridge University Press. 
 Mitra, Subrata K.. (2003). "Chapter 17: Politics in India", in Almond, Gabriel A. et al. (eds.), Comparative Politics Today. 8th edition. New York: Addison-Wesley-Longman, pp. 634–684.  (also reprinted in the 9th (2007), 10th (2012) and 11th (2015) editions)
 Palanithurai, Ganapathi (ed.) (2002–2010) Dynamics of New Panchayati Raj System in India. New Delhi: Concept Publishing Company. in seven volumes, volume 1 (2002) "Select States" ; volume 2 (2002) "Select States" ; volume 3 (2004) "Select States" ; volume 4 (2004) "Empowering Women" ; volume 5 (2005) "Panchayati Raj and Multi-Level Planning" ; volume 6 (2008) "Capacity Building" ; volume 7 (2010) "Financial Status of Panchayats" .
 Shourie, Arun (1990). Individuals, Institutions, Processes: How one may strengthen the other in India today. New Delhi, India: Viking. .
 Sivaramakrishnan, Kallidaikurichi Chidambarakrishnan (2000) Power to the People: The politics and progress of decentralisation. Delhi: Konark Publishers.

External links 

 Ministry of Panchayati Raj, Government of India
 
  about the caste panchayats
 

Constitution of India